A flue is a duct, pipe, or opening in a chimney for conveying exhaust gases from a fireplace, furnace, water heater, boiler, or generator to the outdoors. Historically the term flue meant the chimney itself.  In the United States, they are also known as vents for boilers and as breeching for water heaters and modern furnaces. They usually operate by buoyancy, also known as the stack effect, or the combustion products may be 'induced' via a blower. As combustion products contain carbon monoxide and other dangerous compounds, proper 'draft', and admission of replacement air is imperative. Building codes, and other standards, regulate their materials, design, and installation.

Heat retention
Flues are adjustable and are designed to release noxious gases to the atmosphere.  They often have the disadvantageous effect of releasing useful household heat to the atmosphere when not properly set—the very opposite of why the fire was lit in the first place.

Fireplaces are one of the biggest energy wasters when the flue is not used properly.  This occurs when the flue is left open too wide after the fire is started.  Known as convection, warm air from the house is pulled up the chimney, while cold air from outside is pulled into the house wherever it can enter, including around leaking windows and doors.  Ideally, the flue should be open all the way when the fire is first started, and then adjusted toward closure as the fire burns until it is open just enough to slowly pull smoke from the fire up the chimney.  After the flue heats up from the fire, they are easier to move, but also hotter. Hands should be protected when operating the flue lever; and if a new log is added to the fire, the flue must be adjusted again to ensure that smoke does not billow out into the house.

In some countries, wood fire flues are often built into a heat preserving construction within which the flue gases circulate over heat retaining bricks before release to the atmosphere. The heat retaining bricks are covered in a decorative material such as brick, tiles or stone. This flue gas circulation avoids the considerable heat loss to the chimney and outside air in conventional systems. The heat from the flue gases is absorbed quickly by the bricks and then released slowly to the house rather than the chimney. In a well insulated home, a single load fire burning for one and a half hours twice a day is enough to keep an entire home warm for a 24-hour period. In this way, less fuel is used, and noxious emissions are reduced. Sometimes, the flue incorporates a second combustion chamber where combustibles in the flue gas are burnt a second time, reducing soot, noxious emissions and increasing overall efficiency.

Other uses

Organs
The term flue is also used to define certain pipe organ pipes, or rather, their construction or style.

Bath-houses
Roman thermae constructed centuries ago had flues.

Boilers
Another use of the term is for the internal flues of a flued boiler.

Flue types
Flue types include:
 Open flue – An open flued appliance draws combustion air from its surroundings; exhaust gases rise in a vortex up the open flue. The 19th century Rumford fireplace is an appliance that elegantly refined this principle.
 Closed flue – When an air duct brings combustion air directly to an appliance, there is no air movement between the room containing the appliance. This makes Room Sealed appliances intrinsically safe, since products of combustion (POCs) cannot normally escape into the room. Two major types of closed flues are used with Room Sealed appliances:
 Balanced flue – Use the natural draught created by the hot exhaust, so the flue is as short as possible, usually sufficiently long to pass through an external wall against or near which the appliance is installed. The balanced flue terminal has both flue outlet and air inlet in close proximity, so any draughts or wind gusts pressure both equally and cancel out in the appliance. Thus the burner flame and even pilot lights are not affected.
 Power flue – Fanned flues use the pressure created by a fan to power the movement of outside air into the appliance and combustion products to external air. Thus air and flue ducts can be much longer, of smaller diameter, and include changes of direction. Most ducting is concentric; the air duct contains the smaller flue duct within it. Thus a leak from the inner flue duct will only leak the exhaust into the appliance rather than into a room. However longer runs are possible with two-pipe systems where the flue and air ducts run separately. Instead of using closed flues, some power flues use open flues, taking combustion air from the room housing the appliance. As with all open flues, the provision of adequate ventilation to supply combustion air to such appliances is vitally important.
 False flue – While two or three flues may be required for separate heat sources, several "false" flues may be added at the top of a chimney for aesthetic purpose.
 Die flue – A flue in a die used in injection molding.

See also
Flue gas stack
Combustion
Masonry heater

References

Fireplaces
Heating, ventilation, and air conditioning